The BET Award for Sportsman of the Year is given to the best and most successful male athlete of the previous year. The award was originally titled Best Male Athlete, but was later changed to its current title in 2010. LeBron James holds the record for most wins in this category with nine.

Winners and nominees
Winners are listed first and highlighted in bold.

2000s

2010s

2020s

Controversy
Some of the nominations have brought up some controversy. Reggie Bush was nominated for the award twice, in 2007 and 2009, despite putting up average numbers for a player at his position in both those seasons. In both years, he was nominated among athletes who were considered the best of the best in their sports, which upset some sports fans, as Bush has not accomplished enough to be in the same list as them.

Multiple wins and nominations

Wins

 9 wins
 LeBron James

 5 wins
 Stephen Curry

 3 wins
 Kobe Bryant

 2 wins
 Kevin Durant

Nominations

 19 nominations
 LeBron James

 10 nominations
 Kobe Bryant
 Tiger Woods

 8 nominations
 Stephen Curry

 5 nominations
 Carmelo Anthony
 Odell Beckham Jr.

 4 nominations
 Allen Iverson
 Floyd Mayweather Jr.
 Shaquille O'Neal

 3 nominations
 Kevin Durant

 2 nominations
 Giannis Antetokounmpo
 Barry Bonds
 Reggie Bush
 Victor Cruz
 Cam Newton
 Chris Paul
 Dwyane Wade

See also
 BET Award for Sportswoman of the Year

References

BET Awards